Carabus vogtae, is a species of ground beetle in the large genus Carabus.

References 

vogtae
Insects described in 1943